

Ernő Lendvai (6 February 1925 – 31 January 1993) was one of the first music theorists to write on the appearance of the golden section and Fibonacci series and how these are implemented in Bartók's music. He also formulated the axis system, acoustic scale and alpha chord.

Lendvai was married to the pianist Erzsébet Tusa, and together they moved to Szombathely in 1949 to run a local music school.

Selected works

In Hungarian 
 Szimmetria a zenében (Kodály Intézet, 1994)
 Verdi and Wagner (Bartók and the 19th century) (Kahn & Averill, 1988)
 Verdi és a 20. század: A Falstaff hangzás-dramaturgiája (Zeneműkiadó, 1984)
 Polimodális kromatika (Kodály Zoltán Zenepedagógiai Intézet, 1980)
 Bartók és Kodály harmóniavilága (Zeneműkiadó, 1975)
 Bartók Dramaturgiája (Zeneműkiadó Vállalat, Budapest, 1964)

In German 
 Bartók's Dichterische Welt (Akkord Music Publishers, 2001)

In English 
 
 Bartók's Style (Akkord Music Publishers, 1999)
 Verdi and Wagner (Bartók and the 19th century) (Kahn & Averill, 1988)
 The workshop of Bartók and Kodály (Editio Musica, 1983)
 Bartók and Kodály (Institute for Culture, 1980)
 Symmetries of Music

Notes and references

20th-century Hungarian mathematicians
Hungarian music educators
Hungarian music theorists
1925 births
1993 deaths
20th-century musicologists
Bartók scholars